Esanda Finance Corporation Ltd v Peat Marwick Hungerfords was a High Court of Australia case regarding the liability of auditors to third parties. It was decided on 18 March 1997. The appellant, Esanda, loaned money to a corporation in reliance on a report prepared by a finance company, Peat Marwick Hungerfords. When the borrower defaulted on the loan, Esanda turned to the auditors to recover claiming it had acted on reliance of audited accounts which breached mandatory accounting standards in relation to preparing the accounts and but for this breach of duty by Peat Marwick Hungerford. Central to this argument was that Esanda had suffered a loss which would not have occurred if not for reliance on Excel's audited accounts, which were prepared with a breach of standards.

The Court held that there was no cause of action successfully pleaded by the Appellant and that the appeal should be dismissed with costs. Although this order was unanimous, there were four different judgments emanating from the Court to explain why. This case is generally seen as authority for the proposition that auditors do not owe a duty of care to third parties. However, the case was decided using the multi-factorial approach with reasons against finding a duty being: that Esanda, as a corporation, was not vulnerable as it could have made its own enquiries regarding the financial position of the borrower; and that allowing the appeal may have given rise to indeterminate liability to the auditor.

See also
Ultramares Corporation v. Touche (1932) - leading U.S. case on same issue

Australia and New Zealand Banking Group
High Court of Australia cases
KPMG
1997 in Australian law
1997 in case law